Samuel "The Rifle" Etcheverry (May 20, 1930 – August 29, 2009) was a professional American and Canadian football player and head coach.  Etcheverry played the quarterback position, most famously with the Montreal Alouettes of the Canadian Football League, and was named Canadian football's Most Outstanding Player in 1954. Etcheverry's jersey #92 is one of seven retired by the Alouettes.

Etcheverry is a member of the Canadian Football Hall of Fame, and in 2006, was voted one of the CFL's Top 50 players (#26) of the league's modern era by Canadian sports network TSN.

College career 
Etcheverry was the son of Basque sheep farmers who emigrated to New Mexico. Known as "The Rifle", Etcheverry played for the University of Denver from 1949 to 1951 where he still holds most of the Pioneers' football records for passing offense.

Professional football career 

In 1952, Etcheverry joined the Montreal Alouettes of the Interprovincial Rugby Football Union (which became part of the Canadian Football League in 1958 and was renamed the Eastern Football Conference in 1960). As his team's quarterback, he was twice voted "Most Outstanding Player" of the eastern union and was named an eastern all-star six times (1953–1957, 1960).  In 1954, Etcheverry was awarded the Schenley Award (most outstanding player in the Canadian Rugby Union).

Etcheverry set a single-game passing record of 586 yards in 1954 that stood for 39 years until the 1993 CFL season. He also set a season passing record in 1954 of 3,610 yards that was not only a CFL record but also eclipsed the NFL record set in the 1947 NFL season by Pro Football Hall of Famer Sammy Baugh of the Washington Redskins. He led the CFL in passing from 1954 to 1959. In 1956, he became the first professional quarterback to pass for over 4,000 yards; his record of 4,723 passing yards would stand until 1981 when it was passed by Dieter Brock and Dan Fouts. Etcheverry still holds the record for most passing yards in a Grey Cup game with 508 set in a loss to the Edmonton Eskimos in the 1955 game.

A sports icon in the city of Montreal, when Etcheverry and star receiver Hal Patterson were traded to the last-place Hamilton Tiger-Cats in 1960, it caused an enormous public outcry and led to Etcheverry leaving the Canadian Football League and signing with the St. Louis Cardinals of the National Football League, playing for St. Louis during 1961–62. During 1963 Training Camp, he was demoted to third string by the Cardinals, and asked to be released from his contract. After the Cardinals released him, he signed with the San Francisco 49ers, but was released before the 1963 season started.

Career regular season statistics

Coaching career 
Etcheverry returned to Canada in 1964 as the head coach of the Quebec Rifles of the United Football League. The league folded at the end of the season and Etcheverry remained out of coaching until 1967 when he became an assistant at Loyola College in Montreal.

On December 9, 1969, Etcheverry was hired to coach the Alouettes. In his first season, he led the Alouettes to a 3rd place finish in the Eastern Football Conference with a 7–6–1 record (worst out of the six teams that qualified for the playoffs in the league, which had nine teams at the time that gave three spots to both conferences). They beat Toronto 16–6 to advance to the best-of-2 Eastern Finals against Hamilton. They won 32–22 and 11–4 to advance to the 58th Grey Cup championship game versus the Calgary Stampeders. In a muddy natural grass field (the last for a Grey Cup for over a decade) detested by both teams in Toronto, Montreal prevailed 23–10. The next year, they went 6–8 and missed the playoffs after Ottawa beat them on tiebreakers. They finished 4–10 the next year, but as three teams were guaranteed to make it from the East, Montreal's one game advantage over fourth place Toronto meant a playoff birth. Facing Ottawa in the semifinals, they lost 14–11 to the Rough Ridwrs. He resigned at the end of the 1972 CFL season. His overall record is 14–24–1.

In 1982, he became the general manager and president of the Montreal Concordes. Etcheverry was fired shortly before the start of the 1983 season and head coach Joe Galat replaced him as general manager.

Following the demise of the Concordes, Etcheverry joined a group interested in bringing an NFL franchise to Montreal. He was one of the group's representatives at the 1988 NFL owners meeting.

Head coaching record

Awards and honours 
Etcheverry was inducted into the Canadian Football Hall of Fame in 1969 and was an inaugural inductee into the University of Denver Athletics Hall of Fame upon its formation in 1996.

In November, 2006, Etcheverry was chosen 26th amongst the CFL's 50 Greatest Players in a TSN poll.

Death 
Etcheverry died of cancer in Montreal on August 29, 2009.

References

1930 births
2009 deaths
American football quarterbacks
American players of Canadian football
Canadian football quarterbacks
Denver Pioneers football players
Montreal Alouettes coaches
Montreal Alouettes general managers
Montreal Alouettes players
Montreal Alouettes team presidents
St. Louis Cardinals (football) players
United Football League (1961–1964) coaches
Canadian Football Hall of Fame inductees
Canadian Football League Most Outstanding Player Award winners
People from Carlsbad, New Mexico
Players of American football from New Mexico
American people of Basque descent
Deaths from cancer in Quebec